Battle Zone is a 1952 American Korean War war film. Sequences of the film were shot at Camp Pendleton, California.

Plot summary

A rivalry develops between veteran of World War II M/Sgt Danny Young (John Hodiak) and Sgt. Mitch Turner (Stephen McNally) Marine combat photographers over the attentions of Jeanne (Linda Christian), a Red Cross nurse during the Korean War.

Cast
 John Hodiak as M/Sgt Danny Young
 Linda Christian as Jeanne
 Stephen McNally as Sgt. Mitch Turner
 Martin Milner as Cpl. Andy Sayee
 Dave Willock as Smitty
 Jack Larson as Cpl. James O'Doole
 Richard Emory as Lt. Mike Orlin
 Philip Ahn as South Korean guerrilla leader
 Carleton Young as Colonel
 Jeffrey Stone as Pilot (as John Fontaine)
 Todd Karns as Officer
 Gil Stratton as Runner
 Charles Bronson as Private
 Gregory Walcott as  Rifleman

References

External links
 
 
 
 

Korean War films
1950s English-language films
Allied Artists films
American black-and-white films
Films about the United States Marine Corps
Films directed by Lesley Selander
Films produced by Walter Wanger
American war films
1950s war films
1950s American films